is a Japanese rower. She competed at the 1996 Summer Olympics and the 2000 Summer Olympics.

References

1976 births
Living people
Japanese female rowers
Olympic rowers of Japan
Rowers at the 1996 Summer Olympics
Rowers at the 2000 Summer Olympics
Sportspeople from Aomori Prefecture